"Girls" was the fourteenth single released by British electronic music group the Prodigy on 30 August 2004. It was the first single from the album Always Outnumbered, Never Outgunned. "Girls" peaked at number 19 on the UK Singles Chart, number 18 in Finland and number 12 in Greece.

The single's music video was directed by Mat Cook and Julian House, who also designed the artwork for the album and single. It featured experimental computer graphics with various psychedelic themes. The music video was introduced with animation, in high-definition format made in late-2003 and early 2004.

The sample used in the hook is re-made but taken from the Broken Glass single "Style of the Street" and also the song samples D. Train "You're the One for Me".

Track listings
12-inch vinyl record
 A1. "Girls" (4:06)
 B1. "More Girls"
 B2. "You'll Be Under My Wheels" (Original Mix)

CD single
 "Girls" (4:14)
 "More Girls" (4:27)
 "You'll Be Under My Wheels" (Original Mix) (3:41)

Charts

Promotional single release

On 21 June 2004, "Girls/Memphis Bells" was released as a promotional single by the band as a very limited 12-inch vinyl record. Beyond this, "Memphis Bells" was made exclusively available online as a digital download on 28 June 2004 via a now defunct website. Available in a limited edition of 5,000, each of the downloads had a unique variation of both the track and the artwork.

12-inch vinyl record sides
A. "Girls" (4:06)
B. "Memphis Bells" (4:28)

References

The Prodigy songs
2004 singles
2004 songs
Songs written by Hubert Eaves III
Songs written by Liam Howlett
XL Recordings singles